Wendy Stites (born 1949), also known as Wendy Weir, is an Australian retired production and costume designer. She is best known for her work on the film Master and Commander: The Far Side of the World (2003), for which she was nominated for an Oscar and won a BAFTA Award.

Personal life
She has been married to Peter Weir since 1966. They have two children: a daughter Ingrid and a son Julian.

Partial filmography

As production designer
 The Plumber (1979)
 Dead Poets Society (1989)
 Green Card (1990)

As costume designer
 Master and Commander: The Far Side of the World (2003)
 The Way Back (2010)

Awards and nominations

References

External links
 

1949 births
Living people
20th-century Australian women
21st-century Australian women
21st-century Australian people
Australian costume designers
Australian production designers
Best Costume Design BAFTA Award winners
Best Production Design AACTA Award winners
Date of birth missing (living people)
Place of birth missing (living people)